Ghonbad (also Romanized as Ghonbad) is a village in Bughda Kandi Rural District, in the Central District of Zanjan County, Zanjan Province, Iran. According to the 2006 census, its population was 273, in 74 families.

References 

Populated places in Zanjan County